Giannattasio is an Italian surname. Notable people with the surname include:

Carmen Giannattasio (born 1975), Italian opera singer
Luis Giannattasio (1894–1965), Uruguayan politician
Pasquale Giannattasio (1941–2002), Italian sprinter

Italian-language surnames